Carl Klæth (3 July 1887, Steinkjer – 16 August 1966, Steinkjer) was a Norwegian gymnast who competed in the 1908 Summer Olympics.

As a member of the Norwegian team, he won the silver medal in the gymnastics team event in 1908. He was born and died in Steinkjer and represented the club Steinkjer TF.

References

1887 births
1966 deaths
People from Steinkjer
Norwegian male artistic gymnasts
Gymnasts at the 1908 Summer Olympics
Olympic gymnasts of Norway
Olympic silver medalists for Norway
Olympic medalists in gymnastics
Medalists at the 1908 Summer Olympics
Sportspeople from Trøndelag
20th-century Norwegian people